The Mandagery Sandstone is a Late Devonian geological formation in New South Wales, Australia. It is one of several famed Australian lagerstätten, with thousands of exceptional fish fossils found at a site near the town of Canowindra.

A sandstone block containing 114 fish was discovered in 1956 about 10 km west of Canowindra, on the road to Gooloogong. The Canowindra site was rediscovered by paleontologist Alex Ritchie in 1993, and over 3000 fish fossils have been catalogued and stored at the Australian Museum in Sydney and the local Age of Fishes Museum in Canowindra. Antiarch placoderms make up the majority of specimens recovered; Bothriolepis and Remigolepis are the most abundant fossils, followed by the arthrodire Groenlandaspis. About 20 sarcopterygian (lobe-finned fish) fossils have also been found, including new taxa such as Canowindra, Mandageria, Cabonnichthys, Soederberghia and Gooloogongia. Fossils are preserved as natural moulds in the hard sandstone, filled by a mixture of sandstone, clay, and rare fragments of remaining bone. The detail of preservation is high, with individual armor plates, scales, and the internal structures of major bones all visible in latex casts produced from the moulds.

The Mandagery Sandstone is part of the Hervey Group, a cluster of deformed Paleozoic sediments located near the center of the Lachlan Fold Belt in New South Wales. It is mostly fine-grained red orthoquartzite sandstone, arranged into a number of short sequences. Towards the top of each sequence, the red sandstone is supplanted by thin beds of white sandstone and red siltstone. Cross-bedding and mudcracks indicate that the sandstone was deposited close to the shore.

References

See also 

 Canowindra
 Age of Fishes Museum
 Mandageria
 Canowindra (fish)
 Gooloogongia

Geologic formations of Australia
Devonian System of Australia
Frasnian Stage
Sandstone formations
Lagerstätten
Paleontology in Australia
Geology of New South Wales